Agathiphaga vitiensis, or the Fiji kauri moth, is a moth of the family Agathiphagidae. It is found from  Fiji to Vanuatu and Solomon Islands.

Description
The length of the forewings is about 4 mm. The forewings are long, dorsally dark greyish-brown with fine white hairs, a light yellowish-brown patch on the anal area and a smaller patch of similar colour on the posterior margin.

The larvae feed on Agathis vitiensis. The full-grown larva is about 6 mm long and 2.5 mm wide. It is stoutly built and not flattened. They are yellowish in colour.

Sensilla Morphology 
A. vitiensis, like its relative A. queenslandensis, possesses ten different types of sensilla, which include: Bohm’s bristles, Chaetica I and II, Squamiformia, Trichodea, Biforked basiconica, short basiconica, and Coeloconica I, II, and III. Both sexes of A. vitiensis possess all ten types of these sensilla, and the size of each is relatively similar in size with the exception of Chaetica I (longer in females by an average of 12.8 µm) and Trichodea (longer in males by an average of 7.8 µm).

References

External links
 

Agathiphagidae
Taxa named by Lionel Jack Dumbleton
Moths described in 1952
Moths of Oceania